Vilnius International School is a private primary, middle and upper school located in the Old Town of Vilnius, Lithuania. It was established in 2004 and provides education in the English language. As of 2010, the curriculum at Vilnius International School is the International Baccalaureate educational system, making it the first school in Lithuania to offer the IB Primary Years Programme (PYP). In 2013 school year, the school had 285 students: 40% Lithuanians, 18% half Lithuanian, and 42% foreigners from 34 different nations.

Mission statement 
“Cultivating learners with the agility of mind and confidence of spirit to become culturally proficient human beings.”

See also
 Vilnius International French Lyceum

References

External links 
 Official website

Schools in Vilnius
International Baccalaureate schools in Lithuania
Educational institutions established in 2004
2004 establishments in Lithuania